James Pazhayattil (26 July 1934 – 10 July 2016) was the Syro-Malabar Catholic hierarch, Bishop of Irinjalakuda, India.

Ordained to the priesthood in 1961, Pazhayattil served as bishop of Irinjalakuda from 1978 to 2010.

Notes

1934 births
2016 deaths
Syro-Malabar bishops